Hallville Mill may refer to:

 An historic textile mill whose ruins are included in the Hallville Historic and Archeological District in Exeter, Rhode Island
 An historic textile mill included in the Hallville Mill Historic District in Preston, Connecticut